Pagoda Grama Niladhari Division is a Grama Niladhari Division of the Sri Jayawardanapura Kotte Divisional Secretariat, of Colombo District, of Western Province, Sri Lanka.

Demographics

Ethnicity

Religion

References 

Grama Niladhari Divisions of Kotte Divisional Secretariat